Rolf Magdal Aagaard (born 27 March 1945) is a Norwegian photographer.

He was born in Risør. 

Aagaard worked for one year for Tiden and seven years for Fædrelandsvennen before being hired by Aftenposten in 1970. He was awarded the Narvesen Prize in 1979. He has also held exhibitions, and he has written books including Snow, Shadows of the Winds.

References

1945 births
Living people
People from Risør
Norwegian photographers
Norwegian non-fiction writers
Norwegian photojournalists